Aspergillus aurantiobrunneus is a species of fungus in the genus Aspergillus. It is from the Nidulantes section. The species was first described in 1965. It has been reported to produce emeremophiline, emericolin A-D, variecolin, variecolol, desferritriacetylfusigen, sterigmatocystin, variecoacetal A & B, variecolactone, variecolin, and variecolol.

Growth and morphology

A. aurantiobrunneus has been cultivated on both Czapek yeast extract agar (CYA) plates and Malt Extract Agar Oxoid® (MEAOX) plates. The growth morphology of the colonies can be seen in the pictures below.

References 

aurantiobrunneus
Fungi described in 1965